The Maison du Roi ("King's Household") was the royal household of the King of France. It comprised the military, domestic, and religious entourage of the French royal family during the Ancien Régime and Bourbon Restoration.

Organisation 
The exact composition and duties of its various divisions changed constantly over the Early Modern period.  Officers of the Maison du Roi were directly responsible to the Grand maître de France (Chief Steward). Starting in the 16th century and then from the 17th century on, the Maison du Roi was overseen by a ministry, the Département de la Maison du Roi, directed by a secretary of state, the Secrétaire d'État à la Maison du Roi.  The structure of the Maison du Roi was officially reorganized under Henry III in 1578 and 1585, and in the 17th century by Jean-Baptiste Colbert.

The Military Maison du Roi

The military branch of the Maison du Roi was the French Army Lifeguard brigade, made up of cavalry and infantry units. Officer rank was only open to gentlemen, though some of its units were drawn from elite troops among commoners in the rest of the army. It was not ceremonial and participated in all of France's 16th- and 17th-century campaigns.

The Religious Maison du Roi
The Ecclesiastical Household of the king was headed by the Grand Almoner of France (Grand aumônier de France) (created by Francis I), most often a bishop.  The king's chapel (la chapelle du roi)—which did not originally refer to a building, but to the religious entourage of the king—was in charge of the Mass and religious ceremonies (marriages, baptisms) for the sovereign and the royal family and the king's alms and public charities.

It was headed by the Grand Almoner, who was assisted by the First Almoner, who fulfilled the duties of the Grand Almoner when the latter was unable to.  Other officers of the Maison ecclésiastique included several aumôniers ordinaires (who maintained the regular service of the chapel), the prédicateur du roi (or "king's preacher"), who preached in the presence of the king, and the king's confessor.

The royal chapel also included a group of ecclesiastics and musicians for the religious services, divided into two sections: the chapel and oratory (chapelle et oratoire)—directed by the master of the Oratory (sous-maître de l'Oratoire)—which celebrated spoken Masses, and the grande chapelle—directed by the master of the chapel (maître de la chapelle)—which celebrated Masses in plainchant.  In the reign of Louis XV, the musicians of the two chapels were united. Oversight was eventually transferred (in 1761) from the Ecclesiastical household to the King's Chamber, and the position of master of the chapel was eliminated.

The Domestic Maison du Roi
The Maison du Roi civile, or domestic entourage of the king, was divided into a number of departments, whose number varied over the years.  Under Louis XIV it consisted of 22 departments.  Each department was directed by the grands officiers de la maison du roi de France (a title similar to, but not the same as, grand officier de la couronne de France).  From the 16th to the 17th centuries, the Maison du Roi civile consisted of around 1000–2000 individuals.

The most important departments were the following:

The "Bouche du roi" 
The largest of the departments, the Bouche du roi oversaw the meals of the king.  It was run by the Premier Maître d'hôtel.  The seven offices of the department were:
 gobelet: wine and drink, run by the Grand Bouteiller
 cuisine-bouche: cuisine
 paneterie: bakers
 échansonnerie
 cuisine-commun
 fruiterie: fruits
 fourrière
Officers included the Maître d'hôtel ordinaire, the 12 Maîtres d'hôtel servant par quartier, the Grand panetier, the Premier écuyer tranchant and the Grand échanson (three offices that had become purely honorific in the Early Modern period), and the 36 gentleman servants.

The King's Chamber 
Directed by the Grand Chambrier of France or Grand Chambellan of France, this department oversaw the king's rooms and his personal escort.  After the Bouche du roi, it was the second largest.  It consisted of four First Gentlemen of the chambre, the gentlemen of the chambre, the valets de chambre, the pages, the huissiers and the children of honor.  Their proximity to the king made these charges particularly esteemed.

The "Menus-Plaisirs" 
The complete name of this department  was argenterie, menus plaisirs et affaires de la chambre du roi ("silver, small entertainments and affairs of the king's chamber").   The Menus-Plaisirs du Roi was in charge of theater decor, costumes and props for plays, ballets and other court entertainments.  It was run by an intendant.

The Ceremonies 
Created in 1585 by Henry III, this service was in charge of public ceremonies such as: baptisms, marriages and royal funerals, coronations and the "sacre" (or anointment), royal entries into towns, royal festivals, ambassadorial receptions, États généraux, etc. It was run by the  Grand maître des cérémonies, assisted by the maître and the aide of cérémonies.

The Royal Stables 
Divided in 1582 into two parts:
 the Grande Écurie, run by the Grand écuyer of France, called « M. le Grand », who oversaw the transport of the king and his ceremonial entourage (heralds, men of arms, musicians, etc.)
 the Petite Écurie, run by the premier écuyer, called « M. le Premier », comprising squires, pages, foot valets, coaches, harnesses, saddles and coachmen.

The Venery
This was the king's hunting service, run by the Grand Veneur (the Master of the Hunt and Royal Game Warden), consisted of the vénerie (hunting on horseback), louveterie (the hunt of wolves run by the Grand Louvetier), falcon hunting (run by the Grand Falconer) and the vautrait (boar hunt, run by the Capitaine du vautrait or Capitaine des toiles).

Great Officers of the Royal Household
The major offices of the royal household are sometimes listed as the grands officiers de la maison du roi de France, not to be confused with the Great Officers of the Crown of France, with which it overlaps in part.  Although lists of the Great Officers vary, the following are generally considered Great Officers of the Royal Household:

Domestic household:
 Grand Maître de France (also one of the Great Officers of the Crown of France)
 the First Maître d'hôtel (Chief Butler) - overseeing the king's table and the bouches du roi
 the Grand Panetier of France, overseeing bread
 the Grand Échanson de France, overseeing wine
 the First "Écuyer tranchant", who cuts the meat of the king
 the Grand Chambrier of France or the Grand Chambellan of France, head of the King's chambre, (also one of the Great Officers of the Crown of France)
the four First gentlemen of the King's Chamber, who oversee the King's chambre
the four First Valets of the King's Chamber, who oversee, under the direction of the first gentlemen, the King's chambre
 the Grand Maître de la garde-robe, who oversees the King's wardrobe
the Grand Écuyer de France, the head stablemaster (also one of the Great Officers of the Crown of France)
 the first écuyer de France, who seconds the Grand écuyer
 the Grand Huntsman of France (Grand Veneur), who directs royal hunts, especially the stag hunt
 the Grand Falconer of France, who directs royal hunts using birds of prey
 the Grand Louvetier of France, who directs royal hunts of wolves and boar
 the Grand Master of Ceremonies of France (grand maître des cérémonies), who directs court ceremonies and protocol
 the Grand Marshal of lodging (maréchal des logis), who oversees lodging of the king, of the court and of the royal household
 the Grand Provost of France, who heads the court police, and for this purpose, has jurisdiction over the military troops of the Maison du Roi
 the Grand Almoner of France, at the head of the royal chapel and the head of the Ecclesiastical House of the King (the maison ecclésiastique du roi de France)
the first Almoner of France, who aids the Grand Almoner

Military household:
Captain of the bodyguard
Captain-colonel of the Cent-Suisses
Colonel General of the Suisses et Grisons
Captain-colonel of the guards of the king's door
Captain-lieutenant of the gendarmes of the guard
Captain-lieutenant of the chevau-légers (light cavalry) of the guard
Colonel General of the Musketeers of the guard
Captain-lieutenant of the first company of the Musketeers of the guard
Captain-lieutenant of the grenadiers à cheval of the guard

The Secretary of State of the Maison du Roi

Starting in the 16th century and then from the 17th century on, the Maison du Roi was overseen by a ministry, the Département de la Maison du Roi. This ministry was directed by a secretary of state, the Secrétaire d'État à la Maison du Roi, although this oversight was purely formal, as the officers of the Maison du Roi were under the direct authority of the Grand maître de France (Chief Steward of France).

In practice, the military branch of the Maison du Roi was run by the Minister of War.  The Secrétaire d'État à la Maison du Roi was, however, in charge of recruiting officers for the Maison du Roi and would receive prospective applications for posts and submit them to the king for his approval.

See also
 Conseil du Roi
 Great Officers of the Crown of France
General:
 Early Modern France
 French nobility

References

This article is based, in part, on the articles Maison du roi, Grand office de la maison du roi de France and Maison ecclésiastique du roi de France from the French Wikipedia, retrieved on August 11, September 1 and September 9, 2006.

 Bernard Barbiche, Les institutions de la monarchie française à l'époque moderne, XVIe - XVIIIe siècle, Paris : PUF, 1999, 2nd edition. 2001.
 Père Anselme de Sainte-Marie (o.c.m.), Histoire généalogique et chronologique de la Maison royale de France, des pairs et grands officiers de la Couronne et de la Maison du Roi, Compagnie des Libraires associés, 1737.
 Jean-François Solnon, art. « Maison du roi », Dictionnaire du Grand Siècle, s. dir, François Bluche, Fayard, 1990.
 Louis Susane, Histoire de la cavalerie française (3 vols). Reprinted C. Terana, Paris, 1984. .

External links
 La Maison du Roi on www.heraldica.org (in English)
French heraldry site (in French) - Grand Officers of the Crown and Grand Officers of the Household
 French heraldry site (in French) - Maison du roi civile
 Maison du Roi - Emerging Designer Fashion Store named after the name (in English)

 
 
Royal households